Jamsilsaenae Station is a station on Seoul Subway Line 2, located in Jamsil-dong, Songpa-gu, Seoul.
On December 15, 2016, it was decided to change the name Sincheon to Jamsilsaenae, to avoid confusion with Sinchon Station on the opposite end of the line. Saenae is the native Korean pronunciation of the Sino-Korean Sincheon, meaning "new stream".

Station layout

References

Seoul Metropolitan Subway stations
Metro stations in Songpa District
Railway stations opened in 1980
1980 establishments in South Korea
20th-century architecture in South Korea